Théo De Percin (born 2 February 2001) is a French professional footballer who plays as a goalkeeper for Ligue 1 club Auxerre.

Career
A youth product of Auxerre since 2014, De Percin signed his first professional contract with the club on 18 March 2021. He made his professional debut with Auxerre in a 3–1 Coupe de France loss to Lille on 18 December 2021.

Personal life
Born in Tarbes, France, De Percin is of Martiniquais descent.

References

External links
 
 AJA Profile

2001 births
Living people
French people of Martiniquais descent
Sportspeople from Tarbes
Black French sportspeople
French footballers
Footballers from Occitania (administrative region)
Association football goalkeepers
Championnat National 2 players
Championnat National 3 players
AJ Auxerre players